Kozlovo is the name of several inhabited localities in Russia.

Modern localities

Astrakhan Oblast
As of 2010, one rural locality in Astrakhan Oblast bears this name:
Kozlovo, Astrakhan Oblast, a selo in Kozlovsky Selsoviet of Volodarsky District

Bryansk Oblast
As of 2010, one rural locality in Bryansk Oblast bears this name:
Kozlovo, Bryansk Oblast, a village in Bykhovsky Selsoviet of Komarichsky District

Irkutsk Oblast
As of 2010, one rural locality in Irkutsk Oblast bears this name:
Kozlovo, Irkutsk Oblast, a selo in Kachugsky District

Ivanovo Oblast
As of 2010, two rural localities in Ivanovo Oblast bear this name:
Kozlovo, Gavrilovo-Posadsky District, Ivanovo Oblast, a selo in Gavrilovo-Posadsky District
Kozlovo, Privolzhsky District, Ivanovo Oblast, a village in Privolzhsky District

Kaluga Oblast
As of 2010, two rural localities in Kaluga Oblast bear this name:
Kozlovo, Kaluga, Kaluga Oblast, a selo under the administrative jurisdiction of the City of Kaluga
Kozlovo, Maloyaroslavetsky District, Kaluga Oblast, a selo in Maloyaroslavetsky District

Kemerovo Oblast
As of 2010, one rural locality in Kemerovo Oblast bears this name:
Kozlovo, Kemerovo Oblast, a village in Lukoshinskaya Rural Territory of Topkinsky District

Kirov Oblast
As of 2010, one rural locality in Kirov Oblast bears this name:
Kozlovo, Kirov Oblast, a village in Podgortsevsky Rural Okrug of Yuryansky District

Kostroma Oblast
As of 2010, three rural localities in Kostroma Oblast bear this name:
Kozlovo, Kologrivsky District, Kostroma Oblast, a village in Sukhoverkhovskoye Settlement of Kologrivsky District
Kozlovo, Kostromskoy District, Kostroma Oblast, a village in Kotovskoye Settlement of Kostromskoy District
Kozlovo, Makaryevsky District, Kostroma Oblast, a village in Nezhitinskoye Settlement of Makaryevsky District

Krasnoyarsk Krai
As of 2010, one rural locality in Krasnoyarsk Krai bears this name:
Kozlovo, Krasnoyarsk Krai, a village in Kazantsevsky Selsoviet of Shushensky District

Kurgan Oblast
As of 2010, one rural locality in Kurgan Oblast bears this name:
Kozlovo, Kurgan Oblast, a village in Stanovskoy Selsoviet of Ketovsky District

Leningrad Oblast
As of 2010, one rural locality in Leningrad Oblast bears this name:
Kozlovo, Leningrad Oblast, a logging depot settlement under the administrative jurisdiction of Kamennogorskoye Settlement Municipal Formation of Vyborgsky District

Moscow Oblast
As of 2010, five rural localities in Moscow Oblast bear this name:
Kozlovo, Pavlovo-Posadsky District, Moscow Oblast, a village in Ulitinskoye Rural Settlement of Pavlovo-Posadsky District
Kozlovo, Ruzsky District, Moscow Oblast, a village in Volkovskoye Rural Settlement of Ruzsky District
Kozlovo, Sergiyevo-Posadsky District, Moscow Oblast, a village in Shemetovskoye Rural Settlement of Sergiyevo-Posadsky District
Kozlovo, Shakhovskoy District, Moscow Oblast, a village in Stepankovskoye Rural Settlement of Shakhovskoy District
Kozlovo, Volokolamsky District, Moscow Oblast, a village in Kashinskoye Rural Settlement of Volokolamsky District

Nizhny Novgorod Oblast
As of 2010, three rural localities in Nizhny Novgorod Oblast bear this name:
Kozlovo, Semyonov, Nizhny Novgorod Oblast, a village in Khakhalsky Selsoviet of the town of oblast significance of Semyonov
Kozlovo, Krasnobakovsky District, Nizhny Novgorod Oblast, a village in Zubilikhinsky Selsoviet of Krasnobakovsky District
Kozlovo, Sokolsky District, Nizhny Novgorod Oblast, a village in Volzhsky Selsoviet of Sokolsky District

Novgorod Oblast
As of 2013, five rural localities in Novgorod Oblast bear this name:
Kozlovo, Sushanskoye Settlement, Borovichsky District, Novgorod Oblast, a village in Sushanskoye Settlement of Borovichsky District
Kozlovo, Travkovskoye Settlement, Borovichsky District, Novgorod Oblast, a village in Travkovskoye Settlement of Borovichsky District
Kozlovo, Moshenskoy District, Novgorod Oblast, a village in Kirovskoye Settlement of Moshenskoy District
Kozlovo, Novoselskoye Settlement, Starorussky District, Novgorod Oblast, a village in Novoselskoye Settlement of Starorussky District
Kozlovo, Valdaysky District, Novgorod Oblast, a village in Ivanteyevskoye Settlement of Valdaysky District

Novosibirsk Oblast
As of 2010, one rural locality in Novosibirsk Oblast bears this name:
Kozlovo, Novosibirsk Oblast, a village in Kochenyovsky District

Oryol Oblast
As of 2010, one rural locality in Oryol Oblast bears this name:
Kozlovo, Oryol Oblast, a village in Gagarinsky Selsoviet of Korsakovsky District

Pskov Oblast
As of 2010, eleven rural localities in Pskov Oblast bear this name:
Kozlovo (Yushkinskaya Rural Settlement), Gdovsky District, Pskov Oblast, a village in Gdovsky District; municipally, a part of Yushkinskaya Rural Settlement of that district
Kozlovo (Samolvovskaya Rural Settlement), Gdovsky District, Pskov Oblast, a village in Gdovsky District; municipally, a part of Samolvovskaya Rural Settlement of that district
Kozlovo (Ivanovskaya Rural Settlement), Nevelsky District, Pskov Oblast, a village in Nevelsky District; municipally, a part of Ivanovskaya Rural Settlement of that district
Kozlovo (Lobkovskaya Rural Settlement), Nevelsky District, Pskov Oblast, a village in Nevelsky District; municipally, a part of Lobkovskaya Rural Settlement of that district
Kozlovo (Lobkovskaya Rural Settlement), Nevelsky District, Pskov Oblast, a village in Nevelsky District; municipally, a part of Lobkovskaya Rural Settlement of that district
Kozlovo, Novosokolnichesky District, Pskov Oblast, a village in Novosokolnichesky District
Kozlovo, Opochetsky District, Pskov Oblast, a village in Opochetsky District
Kozlovo, Plyussky District, Pskov Oblast, a village in Plyussky District
Kozlovo, Porkhovsky District, Pskov Oblast, a village in Porkhovsky District
Kozlovo, Sebezhsky District, Pskov Oblast, a village in Sebezhsky District
Kozlovo, Velikoluksky District, Pskov Oblast, a village in Velikoluksky District

Smolensk Oblast
As of 2010, three rural localities in Smolensk Oblast bear this name:
Kozlovo, Glinkovsky District, Smolensk Oblast, a village in Belokholmskoye Rural Settlement of Glinkovsky District
Kozlovo, Kardymovsky District, Smolensk Oblast, a village in Molkovskoye Rural Settlement of Kardymovsky District
Kozlovo, Roslavlsky District, Smolensk Oblast, a village in Khoroshovskoye Rural Settlement of Roslavlsky District

Tula Oblast
As of 2010, one rural locality in Tula Oblast bears this name:
Kozlovo, Tula Oblast, a selo in Rakitinskaya Rural Administration of Uzlovsky District

Tver Oblast
As of 2010, nineteen inhabited localities in Tver Oblast bear this name:

Urban localities
Kozlovo, Konakovsky District, Tver Oblast, an urban-type settlement in Konakovsky District

Rural localities
Kozlovo, Andreapolsky District, Tver Oblast, a village in Andreapolskoye Rural Settlement of Andreapolsky District
Kozlovo, Bezhetsky District, Tver Oblast, a village in Zhitishchenskoye Rural Settlement of Bezhetsky District
Kozlovo, Kalininsky District, Tver Oblast, a village in Turginovskoye Rural Settlement of Kalininsky District
Kozlovo, Kashinsky District, Tver Oblast, a village in Verkhnetroitskoye Rural Settlement of Kashinsky District
Kozlovo, Gorodenskoye Rural Settlement, Konakovsky District, Tver Oblast, a village in Gorodenskoye Rural Settlement of Konakovsky District
Kozlovo, Krasnokholmsky District, Tver Oblast, a village in Nivskoye Rural Settlement of Krasnokholmsky District
Kozlovo, Likhoslavlsky District, Tver Oblast, a village in Tolmachevskoye Rural Settlement of Likhoslavlsky District
Kozlovo, Novoselkovskoye Rural Settlement, Nelidovsky District, Tver Oblast, a village in Novoselkovskoye Rural Settlement of Nelidovsky District
Kozlovo, Selyanskoye Rural Settlement, Nelidovsky District, Tver Oblast, a village in Selyanskoye Rural Settlement of Nelidovsky District
Kozlovo, Selizharovsky District, Tver Oblast, a village in Bolshekoshinskoye Rural Settlement of Selizharovsky District
Kozlovo, Kozlovskoye Rural Settlement, Spirovsky District, Tver Oblast, a selo in Kozlovskoye Rural Settlement of Spirovsky District
Kozlovo, Penkovskoye Rural Settlement, Spirovsky District, Tver Oblast, a village in Penkovskoye Rural Settlement of Spirovsky District
Kozlovo, Pankovo Rural Settlement, Staritsky District, Tver Oblast, a village in Pankovo Rural Settlement of Staritsky District
Kozlovo, Stepurinskoye Rural Settlement, Staritsky District, Tver Oblast, a village in Stepurinskoye Rural Settlement of Staritsky District
Kozlovo, Toropetsky District, Tver Oblast, a village in Ploskoshskoye Rural Settlement of Toropetsky District
Kozlovo, Torzhoksky District, Tver Oblast, a village in Rudnikovskoye Rural Settlement of Torzhoksky District
Kozlovo, Zharkovsky District, Tver Oblast, a village in Shchucheyskoye Rural Settlement of Zharkovsky District
Kozlovo, Zubtsovsky District, Tver Oblast, a village in Vazuzskoye Rural Settlement of Zubtsovsky District

Udmurt Republic
As of 2010, one rural locality in the Udmurt Republic bears this name:
Kozlovo, Udmurt Republic, a village in Podshivalovsky Selsoviet of Zavyalovsky District

Vladimir Oblast
As of 2010, one rural locality in Vladimir Oblast bears this name:
Kozlovo, Vladimir Oblast, a village in Vyaznikovsky District

Vologda Oblast
As of 2010, fourteen rural localities in Vologda Oblast bear this name:
Kozlovo, Bolshedvorsky Selsoviet, Cherepovetsky District, Vologda Oblast, a village in Bolshedvorsky Selsoviet of Cherepovetsky District
Kozlovo, Dmitriyevsky Selsoviet, Cherepovetsky District, Vologda Oblast, a village in Dmitriyevsky Selsoviet of Cherepovetsky District
Kozlovo, Pertsevsky Selsoviet, Gryazovetsky District, Vologda Oblast, a village in Pertsevsky Selsoviet of Gryazovetsky District
Kozlovo, Ploskovsky Selsoviet, Gryazovetsky District, Vologda Oblast, a village in Ploskovsky Selsoviet of Gryazovetsky District
Kozlovo, Kharovsky District, Vologda Oblast, a village in Shevnitsky Selsoviet of Kharovsky District
Kozlovo, Charozersky Selsoviet, Kirillovsky District, Vologda Oblast, a village in Charozersky Selsoviet of Kirillovsky District
Kozlovo, Kovarzinsky Selsoviet, Kirillovsky District, Vologda Oblast, a village in Kovarzinsky Selsoviet of Kirillovsky District
Kozlovo, Pechengsky Selsoviet, Kirillovsky District, Vologda Oblast, a village in Pechengsky Selsoviet of Kirillovsky District
Kozlovo, Nyuksensky District, Vologda Oblast, a village in Gorodishchensky Selsoviet of Nyuksensky District
Kozlovo, Sokolsky District, Vologda Oblast, a village in Dvinitsky Selsoviet of Sokolsky District
Kozlovo, Ustyuzhensky District, Vologda Oblast, a village in Nikiforovsky Selsoviet of Ustyuzhensky District
Kozlovo, Velikoustyugsky District, Vologda Oblast, a village in Shemogodsky Selsoviet of Velikoustyugsky District
Kozlovo, Lipino-Kalikinsky Selsoviet, Vozhegodsky District, Vologda Oblast, a village in Lipino-Kalikinsky Selsoviet of Vozhegodsky District
Kozlovo, Yavengsky Selsoviet, Vozhegodsky District, Vologda Oblast, a village in Yavengsky Selsoviet of Vozhegodsky District

Yaroslavl Oblast
As of 2010, eleven rural localities in Yaroslavl Oblast bear this name:
Kozlovo, Bolsheselsky District, Yaroslavl Oblast, a village in Vysokovsky Rural Okrug of Bolsheselsky District
Kozlovo, Pokrovsky Rural Okrug, Borisoglebsky District, Yaroslavl Oblast, a village in Pokrovsky Rural Okrug of Borisoglebsky District
Kozlovo, Yakovtsevsky Rural Okrug, Borisoglebsky District, Yaroslavl Oblast, a village in Yakovtsevsky Rural Okrug of Borisoglebsky District
Kozlovo, Seredskoy Rural Okrug, Danilovsky District, Yaroslavl Oblast, a village in Seredskoy Rural Okrug of Danilovsky District
Kozlovo, Shagotsky Rural Okrug, Danilovsky District, Yaroslavl Oblast, a village in Shagotsky Rural Okrug of Danilovsky District
Kozlovo, Nekouzsky District, Yaroslavl Oblast, a selo in Shestikhinsky Rural Okrug of Nekouzsky District
Kozlovo, Kholmovsky Rural Okrug, Poshekhonsky District, Yaroslavl Oblast, a village in Kholmovsky Rural Okrug of Poshekhonsky District
Kozlovo, Sverdlovsky Rural Okrug, Poshekhonsky District, Yaroslavl Oblast, a village in Sverdlovsky Rural Okrug of Poshekhonsky District
Kozlovo, Rostovsky District, Yaroslavl Oblast, a village in Novo-Nikolsky Rural Okrug of Rostovsky District
Kozlovo, Tutayevsky District, Yaroslavl Oblast, a village in Pomogalovsky Rural Okrug of Tutayevsky District
Kozlovo, Yaroslavsky District, Yaroslavl Oblast, a village in Ryutnevsky Rural Okrug of Yaroslavsky District

Zabaykalsky Krai
As of 2010, one rural locality in Zabaykalsky Krai bears this name:
Kozlovo, Zabaykalsky Krai, a selo in Kalgansky District

Abolished localities
Kozlovo, Mednikovskoye Settlement, Starorussky District, Novgorod Oblast, a village in Mednikovskoye Settlement of Starorussky District of Novgorod Oblast; abolished in December 2012